Cymindis pindicola is a species of ground beetle in the subfamily Harpalinae. It was described by Apfelbeck in 1901.

References

pindicola
Beetles described in 1901